Sir Arthur Antony Duff  (25 February 1920 – 13 August 2000) was a senior British diplomat and Director General of MI5.

Early life and naval service
Born in 1920 to Admiral Sir Arthur Allen Morison Duff KCB and Margaret Grace Dawson at Var Trees House, Moreton.

Diplomatic career
After the war Duff joined the Diplomatic Service in January 1946. He was Counsellor and Head of the Chancery of the United Kingdom Embassy in West Germany from 1962 to 1964, the British Ambassador to Nepal from 1964 to 1965; the Head of the South Asia Department of the Foreign Office from 1965 to 1969; the Deputy High Commissioner to Malaysia from 1969 to 1972; and the British High Commissioner to Kenya from 1972 to 1975.

Duff was the Deputy Under Secretary for Middle East and Africa from 1975 to 1977; and the Deputy Under Secretary for Defence and Intelligence from 1977 to 1990, including serving concurrently as the Senior Deputy Under Secretary from 1976 to 1979. Having led the British official delegation to the Lancaster House talks, he became Deputy Governor of Southern Rhodesia under Lord Soames from 1979 to 1980.

Cabinet Office and MI5
Duff was sworn of the Privy Council in 1980, the first diplomat to be so honoured since Sir Alexander Cadogan in 1940. Duff was Deputy Secretary (Intelligence and Security Co-ordinator) at the Cabinet Office with responsibility for security matters from 1980 to 1984. He was then Director General of the Security Service (MI5) from 1985 to 1988.

Later life
After his retirement in January 1988, Duff worked as a volunteer in a centre for the homeless and was a board member of Homeless Network in London.

References

Further reading

1920 births
2000 deaths
Chairs of the Joint Intelligence Committee (United Kingdom)
Commanders of the Royal Victorian Order
Companions of the Distinguished Service Order
Ambassadors of the United Kingdom to Nepal
High Commissioners of the United Kingdom to Kenya
Directors General of MI5
Knights Grand Cross of the Order of St Michael and St George
Members of HM Diplomatic Service
Members of the Privy Council of the United Kingdom
Recipients of the Distinguished Service Cross (United Kingdom)
Royal Navy officers of World War II
Royal Navy submarine commanders
British expatriates in Southern Rhodesia
British expatriates in Malaysia
British expatriates in Germany
20th-century British diplomats